Lee Jun-hyuk (born December 20, 1995) is a South Korean football player. He plays for J3 League club SC Sagamihara.

References

External links

1995 births
Living people
South Korean footballers
J3 League players
SC Sagamihara players
Association football defenders